Viveca Elisabeth Marianne Serlachius Olsson (2 March 1923 – 9 January 1993) was a Finnish-born Swedish actress, best known as the first actress to play Pippi Longstocking on film, Pippi Longstocking in 1949, when she was aged 26 portraying a 9-year-old girl.

She was married to Torbjörn Olsson from 1954 until her death in 1993.

Selected filmography
 The Journey Away (1945)
 The Night Watchman's Wife (1947)
 I Love You Karlsson (1947)
 Pippi Longstocking (1949)
 Playing Truant (1949)
 Fiancée for Hire (1950)
 The Motor Cavaliers (1950)
 Teacher's First Born (1950)
 Defiance (1952)

References

External links

1923 births
1993 deaths
Actresses from Helsinki
20th-century Swedish actresses
Finnish emigrants to Sweden